The 2016–17 season will be Sloboda Užice's 3rd consecutive season in the Serbian First League. Originally the club was meant to be playing in the Serbian League West with finishing 13th the previous season, but due to the exclusion of Sloga PM the club kept their First League status. The pre-season started on 11 July.

Transfers

In

Out

Friendlies

Fixtures

League table

Pld = Matches played; W = Matches won; D = Matches drawn; L = Matches lost; GF = Goals for; GA = Goals against; GD = Goal difference; Pts = Points

Serbian Cup

Squad statistics

References

External links
 Serbian SuperLiga official website
 Serbian First League official website
 Sloboda Užice official website

FK Sloboda Užice
Sloboda Uzice